Michael Joseph Dwyer (April 8, 1893 – November 21, 1968) was an American football coach. He served as the head football coach at the University of Toledo from 1921 to 1922, compiling a record of 5–7–3. Dwyer was the husband of Florence P. Dwyer, a member of the United States House of Representatives from 1957 to 1973.

A native of Antrim, Pennsylvania, Dwyer graduated from Mount St. Mary's University in Emmitsburg, Maryland in 1916. He later worked for Western Electric in Kearny, New Jersey, retiring as public relations director in 1957. Dwyer died on November 21, 1968, at John E. Runnells Hospital in Berkeley Heights, New Jersey.

Head coaching record

College

References

External links
 

1893 births
1968 deaths
Toledo Rockets football coaches
High school football coaches in Ohio
Mount St. Mary's University alumni
University of Toledo alumni
People from Tioga County, Pennsylvania